Dalhousie Road is a community in the Canadian province of Nova Scotia, located in Kings County. It is named after George Ramsay, 9th Earl of Dalhousie.

References

  Dalhousie Road on Destination Nova Scotia

Communities in Kings County, Nova Scotia
General Service Areas in Nova Scotia